Mazzarino may refer ro:

 Mazzarino, Sicily, a city and commune in Sicily, Italy
 Mazzarino Friars, a criminal group of Capuchin friars active in Mazzarino in the 1950s and 60s
 Joey Mazzarino (born 1968), American puppeteer and actor
 Giulio Raimondo Mazzarino (1602–1661), Italian cardinal
 Michele Mazzarino (1605–1648), Italian cardinal
 Nicolás Mazzarino (born 1975), Uruguyan basketball player
 Santo Mazzarino (1916–1987), Italian historian